Chamoux is a commune in the Yonne department in Bourgogne-Franche-Comté in north-central France.

Its inhabitants are called Chamoutins.

Economy 
The commune lives off of crop and livestock farming, as well as forestry.

Places and Monuments 
The pre-historic attraction Cardo Land contains more than 80 life-size sculptures of dinosaurs and prehistoric man. It is the work of the sculptor Cardo.

See also
Communes of the Yonne department

References

Communes of Yonne